David Kesterton (born 1948) is a Canadian novelist.  His first book, The Darkling was published in 1982 by Arkham House. A corrected, authorized edition was published in 2011 by Necrominster Press.

References

External links

1948 births
Canadian fantasy writers
Living people
Writers from Regina, Saskatchewan